Andrey Valentinovich Mitin (born 5 April 1970) is a Russian eventing rider. He competed at the 2016 Summer Olympics in Rio de Janeiro, where he got eliminated in the individual competition and placed 13th in the team competition.

In 2021, Mitin got selected to compete aboard Gurza at the delayed Tokyo 2020 Summer Olympics. He completed the event and placed 38th.

References

External links
 

Living people
1970 births
Russian male equestrians
Equestrians at the 2016 Summer Olympics
Olympic equestrians of Russia
Equestrians at the 2020 Summer Olympics